Francesca Maria Steele (21 April 184810 August 1931) was an English novelist, historian, and biographer, who began writing to support her family. She began her writing career with juvenile fiction; she later moved into adult fiction, using the pseudonym Darley Dale for her fiction writing. Intensely religious, she converted to Roman Catholicism in 1887 and later wrote several books on sacred topics.

Early life
Steele was born in London on 21 April 1848. Her parents were Robert Peter Steele  (181610 May 1884), the secretary of the Royal Assurance Company and Frances Mary Francis (8 February 18183 October 1902).

Steele was educated at Bedford College, London, the first higher education college for women in the United Kingdom. Steele lived in Jersey from 1874 to 1884. She began writing in Jersey, with The Jersey Boys in 1878. Her father died on 10 May 1884, and his pension died with him. He had lost everything else in a bank collapse, so Steele's mother was now dependent on what Steele could earn from her writing.

Steele moved to Gloucestershire with her mother and sisters. Steele and her sister Alice Mary (1856c. 1935) converted to Roman Catholicism in 1877. Alice went on to become a nun and was the sister in charge at Tyburn Convent at 6 Hyde Park Place, in London at the time of the 1911 census. Alice was still in charge there twenty years later when Steele died.

Steele had already moved to Loretto House at Stroud in Gloucestershire when her mother died there on 3 October 1902. She was still there nearly thirty years later when she died. Even after her mother died, Steele was still supporting her youngest sister, Emma Caroline, when she applied to the Royal Literary Fund in 1914.

Name variants
Steele was registered at birth and baptised as Fanny Maria Steele, and she used this name up until the 1891 census. By the 1901 census she was using the name Florence Steel, but soon changed to Francesca Maria Steele. She used this name for the publication of The Convents of Great Britain in 1902. In the 1911 Census, she used that form of her name also, and continued to do so. For her writing, she used the pseudonym Darley Dale for all of her fiction, but used her real name for her writing on religious topics.

Works
Steele's work can be divided into three types:
Juvenile fiction. Indicated by juv. in the table below. Steele wrote about 20 books for children. Children's books were usually illustrated and printed in a single volume.
Adult fiction. Indicated by adt. in the table below. Steele wrote over a dozen adult novels. The earlier adult novels were published in as three-volume novels volumes. This was the norm at the time, as such a format had an appeal to circulating libraries. 
Religious topics. Indicated by rel. in the table below. Steele wrote biographies of saints and of important figures in church history, as well as her survey of convents and monasteries. She contributed 21 articles to the Catholic Encyclopedia.

The sources for the table are:
 The Jisc Library Hub Discover Database, that collates catalogues from 161 academic and specialist libraries across the UK and Ireland.
 The list in the Who Was Who article for Steele. 
 The author page for Steele on the At the Circulating Library: A Database of Victorian Fiction, 1837-1901

There seem to be no works by Steele at Project Gutenberg, so the table indicated those cases where online versions of the texts are available.

Example of illustration of one of Steele's books
The following four illustrations by AFB were produced for The Family Failing (1883) by Steele (courtesy of The British Library) Typically, at the time, when it came to novels, only juvenile fiction was illustrated, although serial stories were often illustrated, even if they were for adults.

Later life
At the time of the 1911 Census, Steele was living with her sister Emma Caroline at Loretto House in Stroud. Whatever income she had from her writing, it was obviously not enough as she applied for assistance from the Royal Literary Fund in 1914. In her later years, Steele was an invalid. She died on 16 August 1931, leaving a relatively modest estate of less than £400. Her sister Emma Caroline was her executor, and only survived her sister by four years, dying on 9 December 1935.

Notes

References

External links
Books by Steele in the Jisc database of collated library catalogues.
Books by Steele on the Internet Archive.

1848 births
1931 deaths
Christian hagiographers
Contributors to the Catholic Encyclopedia
Converts to Roman Catholicism
English children's writers
English women writers
Victorian novelists
Writers from London